The Lookouts were an American punk rock band that existed from 1985 to 1990 on Iron Peak, a remote rural mountain community outside Laytonville, California, United States.  The members were Larry Livermore on guitar and vocals, Kain Kong (Kain Hanschke) on bass and vocals, and Tré Cool on drums and vocals.  All three contributed on songwriting.

The band is most famous for being Tré Cool's first band before joining Green Day.

History
Looking to start a punk band, Livermore had trouble finding members, citing the majority of the local musicians being hippies and "completely uninterested in the music we wanted to make." Eventually, Livermore recruited  14-year-old Kain Hanschke on bass and 12-year-old  Frank Edwin "Tré" Wright III on drums.  Although he had never before played drums, young Tré showed an instant affinity for them, likely because, as Livermore said, "he loved making a lot of noise and getting everyone to look at him."

Claiming that the members needed "punk rock names," Livermore gave his fellow musicians new last names.  Kain's surname went from Hanschke to "Kong," while Tré went from Wright to "Cool."  It has often been claimed that Livermore was the person to dub Cool with "Tré."  His family had long before given him the nickname, a play on the word "tres," or "three," because he was the third Frank Edwin in his family.

The Lookouts recorded three albums, Lookout!  It's the Lookouts, One Planet One People, and Spy Rock Road, and two EPs, Mendocino Homeland and IV.

On July 10, 1990, we went into The Art Of Ears studio in San Francisco and recorded nine songs, six of which would ultimately be released [as IV], and then went over to Oakland to play what would be, though we didn’t know it at the time, our last show. I was never that great at lead guitar (or rhythm guitar, for that matter, if we’re going to be honest), so I asked a friend named Billie Joe to play on the recordings.

From there, Livermore went on to running his record label, named Lookout Records; One Planet One People was the first release in the label's history.  Livermore eventually sold Lookout Records to business partner Chris Appelgren in the mid-1990s.  Kong became a National Park Service park ranger.  Cool became drummer for Green Day, after they were left in a lurch by their first drummer.

In 2015, Don Giovanni Records released Spy Rock Road and Other Stories, a compilation featuring all of the tracks from Spy Rock Road, Mendocino Homeland and IV, a few compilation tracks and one from their demo Lookout! It's the Lookouts. Besides a couple of compilation appearances, this marked the first time the band's recordings were released on CD

Members
 Larry Livermore - guitar, vocals 
 Kain Kong - bass, vocals 
 Tré Cool - drums, vocals

Discography

Studio albums
 One Planet One People (1987)
 Spy Rock Road (1989)

Extended plays
 Mendocino Homeland (1989)
 IV (1990)

Compilation albums
 Spy Rock Road and Other Stories... (2015)

Compilation appearances
 "Why Don't You Die?" and "California" on Bay Mud — David Hayes self-released cassette (1986)
 "Recycled Love" on Lethal Noise, Vol. 2 — David Hayes self-released cassette (1987)
 "Insane", "Recycled Love", "The Mushroom Is Exploding" and "Friends of Mine" on  Limited Potential — Limited Potential Records (1987)
 "Outside" on The Thing That Ate Floyd — Lookout Records (1989)
 "Big Green Monsters" on Make the Collector Nerd Sweat — Very Small Records (1990)
 "Once Upon a Time" on More Songs About Plants and Trees — Allied Records (1990)
 "Kick Me in the Head" on Can of Pork — Lookout Records (1992)

Demo albums
 Lookout! It's the Lookouts (1985)

References

External links
  Larry Livermore's blog
  History of The Lookouts by Larry Livermore
  Lookout! Records' Lookouts page
  The Lookouts at Don Giovanni Records

Punk rock groups from California
People from Laytonville, California
Green Day
Don Giovanni Records artists